The Church of the Assumption is the old parish church of the city of Klodzko , , Poland.

It was constructed from the fourteenth through the sixteenth centuries, and houses the remains of Ernest of Pardubitz, the first Archbishop of Prague. The high altar was designed and built by the Tyrolean architect Christoph Tausch in the years 1728–1729. In 1948–1949, it was
the first parish Karol Wojtyla, the future Pope John Paul II, was assigned his first pastoral assignment after completing his graduate studies in Rome and returning to Poland.

Roman Catholic churches in Poland
Kłodzko
Kłodzko